The Grail Movement is an organization which originated in Germany in the late 1940s, inspired by the work of the self-proclaimed Messiah Oskar Ernst Bernhardt (also known by his pen name Abd-ru-shin), principally In the Light of Truth: The Grail Message. Abd-ru-shin did not establish the organization; the Movement as it exists today was formally organized by followers.

The Grail Movement is a new spiritual movement dedicated to the dissemination and spread of the work In the Light of Truth: The Grail Message by Abd-ru-shin.  Most members reside in 16 countries across Europe, primarily Germany and France, with the Grail Movement reporting hundreds of members in Britain and in the USA. It can also be found in Canada, Brazil and currently established in 22 African countries such as Nigeria, Zaire (DR Congo) and Côte d'Ivoire, as well as in South Africa, Australia, New Zealand and Ecuador amongst others.

Worldwide, there are approximately 10,000 members of the Grail Movement. A declaration of the personal commitment to adhere to the principles of the Grail Message can be made by a request for the "Sealing", a Grail Act (ceremony) that takes place during one of three annual Grail Festivals. This, however, is a personal decision on the part of the individual and leads neither to commitment to an organization nor to formal links with other adherents.

Background

The Grail Movement had its beginnings when Oskar Ernst Bernhardt took up residence in Vomperberg, Tyrol (Austria) in 1928, in order to focus on the writing of his major work "In the Light of Truth" - The Grail Message (as Abd Ru Shin), which was then followed by other works.

The establishment of the Grail Settlement on Vomperberg came about when groups of readers of The Grail Message, wishing to live and work in his immediate vicinity, took up residence there. The Settlement developed gradually; adding residences, work and administration buildings and then a small hall with seating for about 300 people. This hall was used by Abd-ru-shin for Sunday Hours of Worship and for the three annual Grail Festivals, Easter Festival etc., to which adherents of the Grail Message also journeyed.

This development was interrupted in 1938 when the Nazi regime annexed Austria and expropriated the Grail Settlement. Abd-ru-shin was arrested on the first day of the annexation and taken to Innsbruck prison. All residents were expelled so that the Settlement could be used as a Nazi training camp. Abd-ru-shin was eventually released but kept under house arrest and surveillance until he died in 1941 in Kipsdorf, Germany.

It was not until late in 1945 when the Allies returned the Settlement to his widow Maria Bernhardt that, under her direction, new development began. During this time the term "Grail Movement" was in common use, as a group designation for adherents of the Grail Message. Over the years national Grail Movements have formed in many countries, some of which, (e.g., Canada, Switzerland, Germany, the Netherlands, Congo (Zaire) and Nigeria) have built their own Halls of Worship although Abd-ru-shin had explicitly stated in his writings that he had not come to establish a new religion.

Publications

Grail Movement books
In the Light of Truth: The Grail Message, Vol. 1 (Paperback). Abd-ru-shin, Grail Foundation Press, 1998,
 The Ten Commandments of God and The Lord's Prayer, Abd-ru-shin, Grail Foundation Press,1995, 
 Knowledge for the World of Tomorrow, Herbert Vollmann, Grail Message Foundation, Germany, 1975, 
 What Lies Behind It...?, Herbert Vollmann, Grail Message Foundation, 1977, 
 Concerning Grail Activities, Herbert Vollmann, Grail Acres Publishing Co Ltd, 1998, 
 From the Heart of Africa, Irmingard Bernhardt, Grail Message Foundation, Grail Acres Publishing Co Ltd, 1981,

References

Bibliography 

 Kurt Hutten: Seher - Grübler - Enthusiasten. 1997, S. 531–549
 Helmut Obst: Apostel und Propheten der Neuzeit – Gründer christlicher Religionsgemeinschaften des 19. und 20. Jahrhunderts. 4., stark erweiterte und aktualisierte Auflage. Vandenhoeck & Ruprecht, Göttingen 2000, 
 Andreas Plagge: "Bernhardt, Oskar Ernst". In: Biographisch-Bibliographisches Kirchenlexikon (BBKL). Band 22, Bautz, Nordhausen 2003, Sp. 120–122, .
 Georg Schmid: Kirchen, Sekten, Religionen. 2003, S. 219–221
 Lothar Gassmann: Zukunft, Zeit, Zeichen. Aufruf zur Wachsamkaeit, Verlag für Reformatorische Erneurung, Kaiserstr.78, D-42329 Wuppertal, 103 Seiten, .
 Patrick Diemling: Neuoffenbarungen Religionswissenschaftliche Perspektiven auf Texte und Medien des 19. und 20. Jahrhunderts, Universitätsverlag Potsdam, 2012, .

External links
 The Grail Foundation
 The Grail Message
 The International Grail Movement
 Westchester Investment Advisor Bilked Fellow Church Members: SEC

1940s in Austria
New religious movements
Social movements in Austria
Spirituality
Christian new religious movements
Self-declared messiahs
Reincarnation
Apocalyptic groups